The 1997 Northern Colorado Bears football team was an American football team that won the 1997 NCAA Division II national championship.

The team represented the University of Northern Colorado in the North Central Conference (NCC) during the 1997 NCAA Division II football season. In their ninth season under head coach Joe Glenn, the Bears compiled a 13–2 record (8–1 against conference opponents), outscored opponents by a total of 489 to 249, and won the NCC championship. The team advanced to the playoffs and won the national championship by defeating  in the championship game.

The team played its home games at Nottingham Field in Greeley, Colorado.

Schedule

References

Northern Colorado
Northern Colorado Bears football seasons
North Central Conference football champion seasons
1996 Northern Colorado
Northern Colorado Bears football